Willie Chu (26 August 1927 – c.2018) was a Taiwanese basketball player. He competed as part of the Republic of China's squad at the 1956 Summer Olympics.

References

External links

1927 births
Year of death uncertain
Taiwanese men's basketball players
Olympic basketball players of Taiwan
Basketball players at the 1956 Summer Olympics
Basketball players at the 1966 Asian Games
Basketball players at the 1970 Asian Games
Republic of China men's national basketball team players